Six ships of the Royal Navy have borne the name HMS Saracen, after the Saracens, a Medieval European term for Muslims:

  was an 18-gun  brig-sloop launched in 1804 and broken up in 1812.
  was another 18-gun Cruizer-class brig-sloop launched in 1812 and sold in 1819. She then made two voyages between  1819 and 1826 as a whaler.
  was a 10-gun  brig-sloop launched in 1831. On 16 October 1839 she captured the Spanish slave trader Brilliante. Saracen was used as a survey vessel from 1854 and exchanged as part-payment in 1862 for a brig named Young Queen, which became the next HMS Saracen.
  was a survey brig, previously named Young Queen, purchased in 1862. She was sold in 1870.
  was a  destroyer launched in 1908 and sold in 1919.
  was an S-class submarine launched in 1942 and sunk in 1943.

See also
 HMS Saracen, a 1965 book by Douglas Reeman

Royal Navy ship names